Black Velvet Whisky is a Canadian whisky brand owned by Heaven Hill and produced in the Black Velvet Distillery in Lethbridge, Alberta. It has a smooth taste and is known for its black labeling. 

Black Velvet was originally produced at Schenley Industries in Valleyfield, Quebec, Canada. Schenley's Black Velvet DeLuxe was the only liquor available to submarine officers at Midway in World War II, where it was held in low regard and known as "Schenley's Black Death".

Original owner Heublein was sold to Grand Metropolitan in 1987. Grand Metropolitan and Guinness merged in 1997 to form Diageo.

In 1999 the distillery was sold by Diageo to Canandaigua Brands. They owned the distillery and brand for 20 years before selling them, along with an inventory of maturing whisky, to Heaven Hill for $266 million (USD).

Originally called "Black Label", the name was changed to "Black Velvet" at the suggestion, in the late 1940s, by the Master Distiller Jack Napier because he thought it had a velvety taste and smoothness.

Black Velvet produces four expressions which are primarily sold on the export market to the United States: Black Velvet Original, Black Velvet Reserve (aged eight years), Black Velvet Toasted Caramel (introduced in 2012), and Black Velvet Cinnamon Rush (introduced in 2013). This brand is ranked number two in Canadian Whisky market share behind Crown Royal. 

The first Black Velvet Lady, Patricia Victoria Miller, was introduced to the world in 1969 as an advertisement tool for Black Velvet. Since that time, such famous names as Christie Brinkley, Cybill Shepherd, Kim Alexis, Cheryl Tiegs, Micah Wylde, and Kelly Emberg have all been Black Velvet Ladies. In addition, actors Telly Savalas, Larry Hagman, George Burns and country singer Tanya Tucker have appeared in the ads. The current Black Velvet Lady is Tami Donaldson, born and raised in Hollywood, Florida.

References

External links
Black Velvet Whisky Homepage

Canadian whisky
Alcohol in Alberta